Timothy Charles Leunig (born 26 February 1971) is an economist at the London School of Economics's Department of Economic History. He is currently on two years' leave to work as a Ministerial Policy Adviser at the Department for Education.

Early life
Leunig attended Sir Joseph Williamson's Mathematical School, a boy's grammar school in Rochester, Kent.

Leunig gained a 1st class BA degree in Modern History and Economics, and then an MPhil in Economics in 1994, and a DPhil in Economics in 1996, all from Oxford University. He won the George Webb Medley Junior and Senior Prize in 1992 and 1994 at Oxford. From the Economic History Association, he won their Alexander Gerschenkron prize in 1997.

Career
In 1998, Leunig joined the London School of Economics. From January 2011 to October 2012, he was Chief Economist at the think tank CentreForum. 

Leunig has written for Financial Times, Prospect and Inside Housing.

Editor
Leunig was the Editor of Explorations in Economic History between 2008 and 2012.

Economic research
Leunig is interested in the productivity of Britain's labour force, from a current or historical perspective. He is known to compare the state of Britain's economy with Britain in the industrial revolution; he has knowledge of both.

Personal life
Leunig married Julia Cerutti in 1996 in north Oxfordshire, who attended St Hilda's College, Oxford, from 1989 to 1992. His wife is an actuary at the Government Actuary's Department.

He is a keen gardener, and his garden, with a stream and waterfall, is part of the National Gardens Scheme.

He has been supportive of the Kingston upon Thames Liberal Democrats.

He lives in Kingston upon Thames.

References

External links
 GOV.UK
 LSE
 

1971 births
Academics of the London School of Economics
Alumni of Nuffield College, Oxford
Alumni of The Queen's College, Oxford
British economists
Economic historians
Living people
Fellows of Nuffield College, Oxford
People educated at Sir Joseph Williamson's Mathematical School
People from Kingston upon Thames
People from Rochester, Kent